On November 1, 1897, the Republic of Biak-na-Bato was established in the cave of Biak-na-Bato, San Miguel de Mayumo, Bulacan. A special election was called for the new Supreme Council to oversee the newly established government on November 2, 1897 in the Philippines.

Results
The election results were as follows:

Pact of Biak-na-Bato

On December 14, 1897, the Pact of Biak-na-Bato was signed. Under the pact, Aguinaldo agreed to end hostilities and to exile himself and the revolutionary leadership, in exchange for amnesty and cash 'indemnities' in the amount of 800,000 pesos. Aguinaldo took the money offered and, along with 34 other leaders of the rebellion, exiled himself in Hong Kong. The following were the officers of the Supreme Council that oversaw the pact. Emilio Aguinaldo was President and Mariano Trias, the Vice President. Other officials included Antonio Montenegro for Foreign Affairs, Isabelo Artacho for the Interior, Baldomero Aguinaldo for the Treasury, and Emiliano Riego de Dios for War.

See also
Emilio Aguinaldo

References

1897 elections in the Philippines
1897 in the Philippines
History of Cavite
Philippine Revolution
November 1897 events